Indriķis is a Latvian masculine given name. It is the Latvian form of Henry and may refer to:

Indriķis Alunāns, young Latvian and journalist 
 Indriķis Blankenburgs, Latvian architect
 Indriķis Jurko, Latvian General and military officer, one of the principal commanders of Battle of Jelgava (1944)
 Indriķis Laube, German-Latvian translator and writer 
Indriķis Muižnieks, Latvian scholar and professor 
 Indriķis Pūliņš, Latvian sailor and ship building engineer
 Indriķis Šterns, Latvian historian 
 Indriķis Zeberiņš, Latvian painter
 Indriķis Zīle, first Latvian Song and Dance Festival director and composer
 Indriķis Zvejnieks, Latvian revolutionary